Church Glacier is a tributary glacier,  long, flowing southward along the west side of nearby Church Ridge to enter Leander Glacier northwest of Shadow Bluff, in the Admiralty Mountains, a major mountain range situated in Victoria Land, Antarctica. It was mapped by the United States Geological Survey from surveys and from U.S. Navy air photos, 1960–63, and named by the Advisory Committee on Antarctic Names for Brooks D. Church, a laboratory management technician at McMurdo Station, Hut Point Peninsula, Ross Island, 1966–67 and 1967–68. The glacier lies on the Pennell Coast, a portion of Antarctica lying between Cape Williams and Cape Adare.

References 

Glaciers of Pennell Coast